Hilda  is one of several female given names derived from the name Hild, formed from Old Norse , meaning 'battle'. Hild, a Nordic-German Bellona, was a Valkyrie who conveyed fallen warriors to Valhalla. Warfare was often called Hild's Game. The name became rare in England during the later Middle Ages, but was revived in the 19th century. In Sweden it has been in use since the late 18th century, being a popular name throughout the 19th century. Hilde is a variant of Hilda. Another variation on Hild is Hildur.

Hilda is the name of:

People
 Hilda of Whitby (c. 614-680), English saint
 Princess Hilda of Nassau (1864–1952)
 Hilda Bernard (born 1920), Argentine stage, screen and television actress 
 Hilda Bernstein (1915–2006), author, artist, and anti-apartheid and women's rights activist
 Hilda Borgström (1871–1954), Swedish actress
 Hilda Bettermann (1942-2023), American politician
 Hilda Braid (1929–2007), English actress
 Hilda Mabel Canter (1922–2007), English mycologist, protozoologist, and photographer
 Hilda Caselli (1836-1901), Swedish educational reformer
 Hilda Clayton (1991-2013), American U.S. Army specialist and war photographer
 Hilda Conkling (1910–1986), American poet
Hilda Dallas (1878–1958) and sister Irene Dallas (1883 -1971), British suffragettes
 Hilda Eisen (1917–2017), a Polish-born American businessperson, philanthropist, and Holocaust survivor
 Hilda Ellis Davidson (1914–2006), English antiquarian and academic
 H. D. (1886–1961), born Hilda Doolittle, American poet, novelist and memoirist
 Hilda de Duhalde (born 1946), Argentine politician
 Hilda Fenemore (1914–2004), English actress
 Hilda Gadea (1921-1974), Peruvian economist, communist leader, author, and Che Guevara's first wife
 Hilda Gaxiola (born 1972), Mexican beach volleyball player
 Hilda Geiringer (1893–1973), Austrian mathematician and professor
 Hilda Goldblatt Gorenstein (Hilgos) (1905–1998), American oil painter and watercolorist
 Hilda Hewlett (1864–1943), first British woman aviator to earn a pilot's licence, and aviation entrepreneur
 Hilda Heine (1951), Marshallese educator and politician
 Hilda Hilst (1930–2004), Brazilian poet, playwright and novelist
 Hilda Phoebe Hudson (1881-1965), English mathematician
 Hilda Käkikoski (1864-1912), Finnish politician, writer and schoolteacher, one of the first nineteen women elected to parliament
 Hilda Kibet (born 1981), Dutch long distance runner
 Hilda Lovell-Smith (1886 - 1973), businesswoman and community organiser from New Zealand
 Hilda Lund (1840–1911), Swedish ballerina
 Hilda Molina (born 1942), chief neurosurgeon of Cuba and dissident
 Hilda Mundy (1912-1980), Bolivian writer, poet, journalist
 Hilda Rix Nicholas (1884-1961), Australian painter
 Hilda Petrini (1838–1895), Swedish clock maker
 Hilda Pinnix-Ragland, American business executive
 H. F. M. Prescott (1896-1972), English author, academic and historian
 Hilda Ramos (born 1964), Cuban discus thrower
Hilda Muhlhauser Richards, American federal labor official
 Hilda Ross (1883-1959), New Zealand politician
 Hilda Runciman, Viscountess Runciman of Doxford (1869–1956), British politician
 Hilda Sachs (1857-1935), Swedish journalist and women's rights activist 
 Hilda Sandels (1830-1921), Swedish opera singer
 Hilda Sjölin (1835–1915), Swedish photographer
 Hilda Solis (born 1957), United States Secretary of Labor in the Obama administration
 Hilda Crosby Standish (1902-2005), American birth control pioneer 
 Hilda Tadria, Ugandan women's rights activist
 Hilda Terry (1914–2006), American cartoonist, creator of the comic strip Teena
 Hilda Vīka (1897–1963), Latvian artist and writer

Fictional characters
 Hilda, title character in Luke Pearson's Hilda series
 Hilda, the 36th hero in Mobile Legends: Bang Bang
 Hilda, the female protagonist of the video game Pokémon Black and White Hilda, a minor character on the family television series The Muppet Show Hilda or Hildegarde (Beelzebub), a main character in the manga Beelzebub Hilda, a pinup girl created by Duane Bryers
 Hilda, the wife of Horace Rumpole, a character in the book and TV series Rumpole of the Bailey Hilda Berg, an airplane boss who can shapeshift into a zeppelin from Cuphead Dame Hilda Bracket, half of the opera singing female impersonation act "Hinge and Bracket"
 Hilda Valentine Goneril, a character from the video game Fire Emblem: Three Houses Princess Hilda of Lorule, a character from the video game The Legend of Zelda: A Link Between Worlds Hilda Ogden, from the British soap opera Coronation Street Hilda Spellman, a main character in Sabrina, the Teenage Witch Hilda Suarez, from the American television series Ugly Betty "Hot Ice" Hilda, a supporting character in the anime Outlaw Star Polaris Hilda, the main antagonist of the Asgard arc in the anime Saint SeiyaSpace
 153 Hilda, a large asteroid in the Hilda group in the Solar System, named after one of the discoverer's daughters.

 See also 
 Brunhilda (disambiguation)
 Hildebrand
 Hildegard
 Gunhild
 Krimhild
 Mathilde
 St. Hilda's (disambiguation)
 Broom-Hilda'', U.S. newspaper comic strip created by Russell Myers
 Hylda (disambiguation)
 Ildikó

References

Feminine given names
English feminine given names
German feminine given names
Dutch feminine given names
Estonian feminine given names
Norwegian feminine given names
Swedish feminine given names
Finnish feminine given names
Danish feminine given names
Icelandic feminine given names
Greek feminine given names
Spanish feminine given names
Scandinavian feminine given names